Sarapo  is a mountain in the Huayhuash mountain range in the Andes of Peru, about  high. It is located in the Huánuco Region, Lauricocha Province, Jesús District as well as in the Lima Region, Cajatambo Province, in the districts Cajatambo and Copa. Sarapo lies south of the Yerupaja and the Siula Grande and east of the lake Sarapococha.

See also 

 Rasac

References

Mountains of Peru
Mountains of Huánuco Region
Mountains of Lima Region